Mkushi South is a constituency of the National Assembly of Zambia. It covers the towns of Chafung, Chingobe and Mboroma in Luano District of Central Province.

List of MPs

Election results

References

Constituencies of the National Assembly of Zambia
1968 establishments in Zambia
Constituencies established in 1968